Rossel is a river flowing on the border of the department of Moselle (France) and Saarland (Germany). It rises in Longeville-les-Saint-Avold near the border of France and Germany and flows northwards into the Saar near Völklingen.

Towns along the Rossel are:
 in France: Longeville-lès-Saint-Avold, Boucheporn, Saint-Avold, Macheren, Betting, Hombourg-Haut, Freyming-Merlebach, Béning-lès-Saint-Avold, Cocheren, Rosbruck, Morsbach, Forbach, Petite-Rosselle
 in Germany: Großrosseln, Völklingen and Saarbrücken

See also
List of rivers of Saarland

References

Rivers of Saarland
Rivers of France
Rivers of Moselle (department)
Rivers of Germany
Rivers of Grand Est
France–Germany border
International rivers of Europe
Border rivers